Devet grla (meaning Nine throats) is a stone and mortar arch bridge over the Aranca river near Mokrin, Serbia. The State Road 104 (section 10404  Crna Bara – Kikinda) passes over the bridge. The border between the City of Kikinda and the Municipality of Čoka lies on the bridge.

The bridge was built in 1860 by the authorities of the Austrian Empire. It is named "Nine throats" because of its nine arches.

References

Sources

Bridges in Serbia